Nicolas About (born 14 July 1947) is a French politician and anti-cultist from the centrist MoDem. He was a member of the French Senate and President of the Centrist Union group. About was the mayor of Montigny-le-Bretonneux from 1977 to 2004. He was elected senator of Yvelines on 24 September 1995 and reelected on 26 September 2004. With Catherine Picard, he helped draft the About-Picard law on 12 June 2001.

External links 
 Official page as a senator

1947 births
Living people
Social Democratic Party (France) politicians
Union for French Democracy politicians
Democratic Movement (France) politicians
French Senators of the Fifth Republic
Senators of Yvelines